The Chiefdom of Mangshi, officially Mangshi Yuyi Zhangguansi and Mangshi Anfusi was a Dai autonomous Tusi chiefdom in the west of Yunnan, China from 1443 to 1955. In 1443, the Ming dynasty established Mangshi Yuyi Zhangguansi because a Mangshi chief made a contribution in Luchuan–Pingmian campaigns, and then upgraded to Mangshi Anfusi in 1640. Chiefdom of Mangshi has an absolute dictatorship in politics, military, economy at the territory, and use the rule of primogeniture.

In the Republic of China period, the central government used many methods try to abolish the Chiefdom of Mangshi, for example, established a direct control government "Luxi Administrate Bureau". But the Chiefdom of Mangshi allied with other chiefdoms to counteract the abolishment. At its worst, chiefdoms had a consideration for independence from China. Finally, the central government compromised with chiefdoms.

After People's Republic of China controlled this area, the central government launched the Chinese Land Reform Movement. The last Chief of Mangshi, Fan Yulong lost his power and land, finally abolished in 1955.

References

Tusi in Yunnan
Former countries in Chinese history
Mangshi
States and territories established in the 15th century
States and territories disestablished in the 20th century
1955 disestablishments in China